Thaumatopsis is a genus of moths of the family Crambidae.

Species
Thaumatopsis actuellus Barnes & McDunnough, 1918
Thaumatopsis atomosella Kearfott, 1908
Thaumatopsis bolterellus (Fernald, 1887)
Thaumatopsis crenulatella Kearfott, 1908
Thaumatopsis digrammellus (Hampson, 1919)
Thaumatopsis edonis (Grote, 1880)
Thaumatopsis fernaldella Kearfott, 1905
Thaumatopsis fieldella Barnes & McDunnough, 1912
Thaumatopsis floridella Barnes & McDunnough, 1913
Thaumatopsis magnificus (Fernald, 1891)
Thaumatopsis melchiellus (Druce, 1896)
Thaumatopsis pectinifer (Zeller, 1877)
Thaumatopsis pexellus (Zeller, 1863)
Thaumatopsis repandus (Grote, 1880)
Thaumatopsis solutellus (Zeller, 1863)

References

Natural History Museum Lepidoptera genus database

Crambini
Crambidae genera